The People's Party of Aragon (PP) is the regional section of the People's Party of Spain (PP) in Aragon. It was formed in 1989 from the re-foundation of the People's Alliance.

Electoral performance

Cortes of Aragon

Cortes Generales

European Parliament

See also
People's Party

Notes

People's Party (Spain)
Political parties in Aragon